Paul Gourdet was a French architect. He is credited for designing numerous major buildings in Kazakhstan including the Voznesensky Cathedral (Ascension Cathedral), the Pokrovskaya Church, and other significant contributions to the architectural development of Almaty. Gourdet was born in Burgundy, and resided in Verny. In 1870 he travelled to the Turkestan region.

See also

 Architecture of Almaty

References

19th-century French architects